Mua or MUA may refer to:

People 
 Mua (title), a chiefly title of Rotuma
 Mua people, an indigenous Australian Torres Strait Island people
 Dickson Mua (born 1972), Solomon Islands politician
 Metuisela Mua, Fijian intelligence officer and politician

Places 
 Mua, Malawi, a village
 Mua District, Wallis and Futuna
 Mua mine, in Portugal

Other uses 
 Air Force Meritorious Unit Award of the United States Air Force 
 Mail user agent, or email client
 Make-up artist
 Manipulation under anesthesia, a chiropractic technique
 Maritime Union of Australia, an Australian labor union
 Marvel: Ultimate Alliance, a video game
 McGill University Archives
 Medical University of the Americas – Nevis, in Saint Kitts and Nevis
 Miss University Africa, a beauty pageant
 Mundang language
 Musicians' Union of Australia

See also
 Mu'a (disambiguation)